Siphonophora can refer to:

Siphonophora (millipede), a genus of millipedes in the family Siphonophoridae
Siphonophora, an alternative spelling of Siphonophorae, an order within Hydrozoa